Denversaurus (meaning "Denver lizard") is a genus of panoplosaurin nodosaurid dinosaur from the Late Cretaceous (late Maastrichtian) of western North America. Although at one point treated as a junior synonym of Edmontonia by some taxonomists, current research indicates that it is a distinct nodosaurid genus.

Discovery and naming
 
In 1922, Philip Reinheimer, a collector and technician employed by the Colorado Museum of Natural History, the predecessor of the present Denver Museum of Nature and Science, near the Twito Ranch in Corson County, South Dakota discovered the fossil of an ankylosaurian in a Maastrichtian age terrestrial horizon of the Lance Formation. In 1943, American paleontologist Barnum Brown referred the find to Edmontonia longiceps.

In 1988, Robert Thomas Bakker decided to split the genus Edmontonia. The species Edmontonia rugosidens he made into a separate genus Chassternbergia and the Denver fossil was named and described as a new genus and species. The type species of this genus was Denversaurus schlessmani. The generic name referred to the Denver Museum of Natural History at Denver, Colorado. The specific name honoured Lee E. Schlessman, a major benefactor of the museum and the founder of the Schlessman Family Foundation.

The fossil the species is based on, the holotype DMNH 468, was discovered in a layer of the late Maastrichtian-age Lance Formation of South Dakota. It consists of a skull, lacking the lower jaws, and a number of osteoderms of the body armour. It is part of the collection of the Denver Museum of Nature and Science after which the genus was named. Bakker referred a second fossil to the species, specimen AMNH 3076, a skull found by Brown and American Museum of Natural History paleontologist Roland T. Bird at the Tornillo Creek in Brewster County, Texas, in a layer of the poorly dated Upper Cretaceous Aguja Formation, possibly from the Maastrichtian also.

Fossil hunters found a nodosaurid skeleton in Niobrara County, Wyoming, nicknamed "Tank", which has been identified as Denversaurus. The specimen contains the lower jaws, parts of the torso and about a hundred osteoderms. It is part of the collection of the Rocky Mountain Dinosaur Resource Center under inventory number BHI 127327.

The validity of Denversaurus was disputed in a 1990 paper on ankylosaurian systematics by Kenneth Carpenter, who noted that Bakker's diagnosis of Denversaurus was based primarily on Bakker's artistic restoration of the holotype in an uncrushed state. Since DMNH 468 was found crushed, Carpenter assigned Denversaurus to an Edmontonia sp., even though he noted its similarity to Edmontonia rugosidens. A number of workers treated Denversaurus as synonymous with either E. rugosidens or E. longiceps, or alternatively a valid species of Edmontonia, an Edmontonia schlessmani.

In an SVP 2015 abstract, Michael Burns revisited the systematics of latest Cretaceous nodosaurids from the Western Interior. According to Burns, Denversaurus is a valid taxon based on its phylogenetic position.

Description
 

American paleontologist Robert T. Bakker considered Denversaurus distinct from Edmontonia and Chassternbergia in having a skull that was wide at the rear and a more rearward position of the eye sockets. The holotype skull has a length of 496 millimetres and a rear width of 346 millimetres. In the referred specimen AMNH 3076 these proportions are less extreme, measuring 395 millimetres long with a rear width of 220 millimetre. According to American paleontologist Kenneth Carpenter, the greater width of both the holotype and the referred specimen was due to crushing.

Vertebrate anatomist and paleontologist Michael Burns in 2015 published an abstract that concluded that Denversaurus was different from Edmontonia but similar to Panoplosaurus in having inflated, convex, cranial sculpturing with visible sulci, or troughs, between individual top skull armour elements, but is distinct from Panoplosaurus in having a relatively wider snout.

Classification
Bakker in 1988 placed Denversaurus within an Edmontoniidae, the presumed sister group of the Nodosauridae within a Nodosauroidea that would not have been Ankylosauria but the last surviving Stegosauria. These hypotheses have not been confirmed by modern cladistic analysis. Today the Denversaurus material, whether it presents a separate species or is identical to E. rugosidens or E. longiceps, is considered nodosaurid and ankylosaurian. Paul suggested that it was the direct descendant of E. longiceps. Burns recovered Denversaurus as the sister species of Panoplosaurus. Denversaurus is the latest known member  of the Thyreophora.

References

Nodosaurids
Late Cretaceous dinosaurs of North America
Lance fauna
Maastrichtian life
Fossil taxa described in 1988
Taxa named by Robert T. Bakker
Hell Creek fauna
Paleontology in South Dakota
Maastrichtian genus first appearances
Maastrichtian genus extinctions
Ornithischian genera